Uaymil is a pre-Columbian Maya archaeological site located on the Gulf Coast of northern Campeche.  The settlement of Uaymil occupies a small island approximately 2.5 kilometers from the coast and 25 km north of Jaina.  The site has been archaeologically investigated by Rafael Cobos, now of the Universidad Autónoma de Yucatán (UADY), who documented 15 structures, 8 of which were situated around a plaza containing an altar (Cobos 2001).  A number of additional monuments and stele were also identified (Cobos et al. 2005).

Ceramic data recovered during archaeological excavation indicate that Uaymil was predominantly a Late to Terminal Classic site.  Ceramic, lithic, and architectural data suggest that Uaymil had economic ties with both Uxmal and Chichén Itzá (Inurreta and Cobos 2003), but largely functioned as a port directly connected to, and dependent on, Uxmal (Cobos 2004).

References
Cobos P., Rafael (2001) Classic Maya Seaports: Uaymil, North Campeche Coast.  Report submitted to the Foundation for the Advancement of Mesoamerican Studies (FAMSI).
Cobos P., Rafael (2004) Entre la costa y el interior: Reconocimiento de una región del occidente de Yucatán. En XVII Simposio de Investigaciones Arqueológicas en Guatemala, 2003, edited by J.P. Laporte, B. Arroyo, H. Escobedo and H. Mejía, pp. 61–66. Museo Nacional de Arqueología y Etnología, Guatemala.
Cobos P., Rafael, Lilia Fernández Souza, and Nancy Peniche May (2005) Las columnatas de Uaymil: su función durante el Clásico Terminal." In Los Investigadores de la Cultura Maya 13, Vol. I, pp. 245–252. Universidad Autónoma de Campeche, Campeche.
Inurreta Díaz, Armando, and Rafael Cobos (2003) El Intercambio Marítimo Durante el Clásico Terminal: Uaymil en la Costa Occidental de Yucatán.  In XVI Simposio de Investigaciones Arqueológicas en Guatemala, Vol. 2, edited by Juan Pedro Laporte, Bárbara Arroyo, Héctor L. Escobedo and Héctor E. Mejía, pp. 1023–1029.  Ministerio de Cultura y Deportes, Instituto de Antropología e Historia, Asociación Tikal.  Ciudad de Guatemala.

Maya sites in Campeche
Former populated places in Mexico
Mayan chiefdoms of the Yucatán Peninsula
Islands of Campeche
Flora and fauna protection areas of Mexico
Protected areas of Campeche